Uttaranchal Sampark Kranti Express is a Sampark Kranti Express train which connects  to  and  of Uttarakhand state in India. The train runs daily via , then split into two trains, one is for Ramnagar and another for Kathgodam. It is the shortest-running Sampark Kranti Express of Indian Railways.

Detail
Departure from Delhi:
Train splits for two destination, Ramnagar and Kathgodam at Moradabad railway station junction.

Arrival to Delhi:
Train start from Kathgodam station and connect to Ramnagar Delhi Link Express for Delhi railway station.

Locomotive
It is hauled by a Tughlakabad-based WDM-3A / WDP-4B / WDP-4D locomotive on its entire journey.

Stoppage

 Main Route;

 Slip Route;

Time Table

References 

 Indian Rail Info
 Indian Railways

External links
 Official booking website

Transport in Haldwani-Kathgodam
Transport in Delhi
Railway services introduced in 2004
Rail transport in Uttarakhand
Sampark Kranti Express trains
Rail transport in Uttar Pradesh
Rail transport in Delhi